"Wild Horses" is a song written by the British rock band the Rolling Stones. It was first released in 1970 by The Flying Burrito Brothers as the Stones didn't think the demo was worth recording fully.  It was subsequently recorded by the Stones for their 1971 album Sticky Fingers when they felt it was worth reconsideration. It was also released on 12 June 1971 as a single, with "Sway" as its B-side. 

Rolling Stone ranked the song number 334 in its "500 Greatest Songs of All Time" list in 2004 and number 193 in its 2021 update.

Inspiration and recording
In the liner notes to the 1993 Rolling Stones compilation album Jump Back, Jagger states, "I remember we sat around originally doing this with Gram Parsons, and I think his version came out slightly before ours. Everyone always says this was written about Marianne but I don't think it was; that was all well over by then. But I was definitely very inside this piece emotionally." Richards says, "If there is a classic way of Mick and me working together this is it. I had the riff and chorus line, Mick got stuck into the verses. Just like "Satisfaction", "Wild Horses" was about the usual thing of not wanting to be on the road, being a million miles from where you want to be."

Originally recorded over a three-day period at Muscle Shoals Sound Studio in Alabama during 2–4 December 1969 while Albert and David Maysles were shooting for the film that was titled Gimme Shelter, the song was not released until over a year later due to legal wranglings with the band's former label. Along with "Brown Sugar", it is one of the two Rolling Stones compositions from Sticky Fingers (1971) over which ABKCO Records co-owns the rights along with the Stones. It features session player Jim Dickinson on piano, Richards on electric guitar and 12-string acoustic guitar, and Mick Taylor on acoustic guitar. Taylor uses Nashville tuning, in which the EADG strings of the acoustic guitar are strung one octave higher than in standard tuning. Ian Stewart was present at the session, but refused to perform the piano part on the track due to the prevalence of minor chords, which he disliked playing.

Music video
A music video, filmed in black and white, was produced to promote an acoustic version in 1995.

Release and legacy
Released as the second US-only single in June 1971, "Wild Horses" reached number 28 on the Billboard Hot 100 chart.

An early, acoustic take of "Wild Horses" was released on the Deluxe and Super Deluxe versions of the reissued Sticky Fingers album on 8 June 2015.

A reworked studio version recorded in 1995 appeared on the album Stripped. This version was released as a single in early 1996.

The song appears on a handful of the Rolling Stones' concert DVDs: Bridges to Babylon Tour '97–98 (1998), Rolling Stones - Four Flicks (2003), and The Biggest Bang (2007).

Jagger's ex-wife, Jerry Hall, has named "Wild Horses" as her favourite Rolling Stones song.

"Wild Horses" figures prominently in the films Adaptation (2002) and Camp (2003).  On television, the song was played during Parks and Recreation in the episode "Li'l Sebastian" (S3: E16) as background music to Li'l Sebastian's memorial service, during the Season 1 finale of Bojack Horseman in the episode "Later", and in Episode 11, Season 5, "Victory Smoke" of Billions.

An instrumental version of the song is featured during the end credits of Martin Scorsese's Rolling Stones documentary film Shine a Light (2008).

Personnel

The Rolling Stones 

 Mick Jagger – vocals
 Keith Richards – twelve string acoustic guitar, electric guitar, backing vocals
 Mick Taylor – Nashville-strung acoustic guitar
 Bill Wyman – bass guitar
 Charlie Watts – drums

Additional personnel 

 Jim Dickinson – tack piano

Charts

Certifications

First issued version

The first issued version of "Wild Horses" was released by The Flying Burrito Brothers on their 1970 album, Burrito Deluxe, almost a year before it appeared on the Rolling Stones release of Sticky Fingers. Keith Richards had given Burrito Bros. member Gram Parsons a demo tape of "Wild Horses" on 7 December 1969, the day after the Altamont Free Concert.

The Sundays' version 

The Sundays recorded the song in 1992. It was released as the B-side to the UK single version of "Goodbye" on Parlophone and on the American release of their second album Blind. It was later released as a promotional single on DGC Records in the United States.

This version of the song was memorably used in the thriller Fear with Reese Witherspoon and Mark Wahlberg, and later in the Buffy the Vampire Slayer episode "The Prom" in which Buffy dances with Angel.

References

1971 singles
1970s ballads
Alicia Keys songs
Rock ballads
Country rock songs
Country ballads
Richard Marx songs
Southside Johnny & The Asbury Jukes songs
Songs written by Jagger–Richards
Song recordings produced by Jimmy Miller
Susan Boyle songs
The Rolling Stones songs
The Sundays songs
Songs about horses
DGC Records singles